Curbia is a monotypic moth genus in the family Geometridae described by Warren in 1894. Its single species, Curbia martiata, described by Achille Guenée in 1857, is found in Peninsular Malaysia, Sumatra and Borneo.

References

Baptini
Monotypic moth genera